Chiriboga is a surname. Notable people with the surname include:

Galo Chiriboga, Ecuadorian lawyer, politician, and administrator
Israel Chiriboga (born 1998), Ecuadorian artistic gymnast
Luz Argentina Chiriboga (born 1940), Ecuadorian writer
Pacifico Chiriboga (1810–1886), Ecuadorian politician